= Cape Uivak =

Cape in Labrador in Canada

- Cape
- Location within Newfoundland and Labrador Location within Canada
- Coordinates: 58°29′01″N 62°33′53″W
- Location: Newfoundland and Labrador, Canada
- Elevation: 161 m (528 ft)
- Topo map: NTS 14L7 Cape Uivak

Cape Uivak is a cape located in the northern part of Labrador in the province of Newfoundland and Labrador, Canada.
